Balochistan or Afghani Baluchistan is an arid, mountainous region that includes part of southern and southwestern Afghanistan. It extends into southeastern Iran and western Pakistan and is named after the Baloch people.

Geography
Northern  Balochistan/ Afghan Balochistan is Nimroz Province, south of Helmand Province and Kandahar Province, Afghanistan.

History
The Baluch are an ethnic group that numbers around 200,000 in Afghanistan. The main Baloch areas located in Balochistan province in Pakistan and Sistan and Baluchistan province of Iran. Many also live in southern Afghanistan, the Baloch are  Muslim. The Baloch population in Afghanistan number approximately 600,000 of which 400,000 are Balochi speakers and 200,000 Brahui speakers. The majority of the Baluch people live in southern Afghanistan. The Balochi speakers are mostly settled in Nimruz Province. The Brahui speakers mainly inhabit Kandahar Province. In Helmand, the Balochi and Brahui-speaking Balochs intermingle. Balochs in other parts of Afghanistan speak Pashto and Dari.

See also
 Baloch people
 Balochistan
 Balochistan, Pakistan
 Balochistan, Iran
 Balochi
 Abdul Karim Brahui
 Nimruz Front
 Seistan Force
 Balochistan conflict

References

External links
A Balochi song from Nimruz about Nimruz
 Balochi Rung

Baloch people
Regions of Afghanistan
Iranian Plateau
Balochistan
Balochi-speaking countries and territories